Live from Scotland Volume 1 was a 1974 album by The Corries recorded at the Glasgow City Halls.

Line-Up 
Roy Williamson
Ronnie Browne

Tracks  
Side One:
1. Fallaldy, R.G. Browne/trad. Arranged The Corries. Pub. The Corries (music) Ltd. R. Williamson Flute, R. Browne Guitar.
2. Mingulay Boat Song, Words Sir Hugh S. Roberton. Arranged The Corries. Pub. Roberton. R. Williamson Mandoline, R. Browne Mandoline.
3. Lads Among The Heather, Trad. From the Singing of Jock Anderson. Arranged The Corries. Pub. The Corries (music) Ltd. R. Williamson Mandoline, R. Browne Mandoline.
4. A Scottish Holiday, Parody of words by J.W. Hill. Pub. The Corries (music) ltd. Music: Road to the Isles by kind permission of M. Kennedy Fraser Est. Pub. Boosey & Hawkes Ltd. R. Williamson Guitar, R. Browne Guitar.
5. Hugh The Graeme, Trad. Arranged The Corries. Pub. The Corries (music) Ltd. R. Williamson Guitar, R. Browne Guitar.
6. Maggie Lauder, Trad. Arranged The Corries. Pub. The Corries (music) Ltd. R. Williamson Banduria, R. Browne Guitar.
Side Two:
1. The Roses of Prince Charlie, R.G. Browne. Arranged The Corries. Pub. The Corries (music) Ltd. R. Williamson Guitar, R. Browne Guitar.
2. Dark Lochnagar, Lord Byron. Arranged The Corries. Pub. The Corries (music) Ltd. R. Williamson Guitar, R. Browne Guitar.
3. Loch Tay Boat Song, Words: McLeod and Boulton. Arranged The Corries. Pub. J.B. Cramer. R. Williamson Combolin R. Browne Combolin.
4. The M.hm Song, Trad. From the Singing of Jock Anderson. Arranged The Corries. Pub. The Corries (music) Ltd. R. Williamson Mandoline, R. Browne Mandoline.
5. Flower of Scotland, R.M.B. Williamson. Arranged The Corries. Pub. The Corries (music) Ltd. R. Williamson Guitar, R. Browne Guitar.

Sleeve notes 
The Corries.

Well known in many lands through their fine performances and records, they have adopted a philosophy to their music which, apart from technique, relies to a large extent on instinct. The Celtic 'More', or instinct, one link with the ancient past which can guide the treatment of an old song today. Their interpretations are creative in the broadest sense, and sincere, in that they compose what they feel is 'naturally' right. They take their music seriously, but are not afraid to have a good laugh with their audience. People are important to them and if they have brought an audience down with a sad ballad, will cheer them up again with something else. This after all is what music is about; expression, entertainment, stories told, battles recalled, bizarre, situations recounted and above all the enjoyment of doing it.

References

External links
The Corries Official Website

The Corries albums
1974 albums